John Zorn's Cobra: Live at the Knitting Factory is an album of a performance of John Zorn's improvisational game piece, Cobra, performed at the Knitting Factory in 1992. The album resembles the missing link between John Zorn's work with Masada and Naked City. It also had a major impact on the electronic scene of New York.

Reception

The Allmusic review by Scott Yanow awarded the album 1½ stars stating "There are some colorful segments, but in general, these self-indulgent performances would be much more interesting to see in person than to hear on record. Taken purely as a listening experience, one is surprised that this material has even been released." Guy Peters stated "If this is your first acquaintance with Zorn’s multifaceted universe, chances are you’ll never visit it again and therefore it only can serve as a treat for those who were there, seriously dedicated fans."

Track listing
All compositions by John Zorn
 "Hemachatus Haemachatus" – 2:11
 "Naja Naja Atra" (Organized by David Shea) – 8:43
 "Many-Banded Krait" – 10:53
 "Taipan" – 1:30
 "D. Popylepis" – 3:20
 "Lampropeltis Doliata Syspila" (Organized by Joe Gallant) – 2:19
 "Boomslang" – 11:07
 "Maticora Intestinalis" – 6:13
 "Acanthopis Antarcticus" – 4:00
 "Hydrophiidae" – 5:42
 "Ngu Sam Liem" – 0:53
 "Ophiophagus Hannah" – 1:25
 "Boulengerina" – 5:23
 "Laticaudia Laticaudia" (Organized by Steven Bernstein) – 3:03
Note: All songs are named after subspecies of Cobra snakes

 All tracks recorded live at the Knitting Factory,  New York City
 Track 1 – recorded in January 1992
 Track 2 – recorded in February 1992
 Track 3 – recorded in March 1992
 Tracks 4 & 5 – recorded in April 1992
 Track 6 – recorded in May 1992
 Track 7 – recorded in June 1992
 Track 8 – recorded in July 1992
 Track 9 – recorded in August 1992
 Track 10 – recorded in September 1992
 Tracks 11 & 12 – recorded in October 1992
 Track 13 – recorded in November 1992
 Track 14 – recorded in December 1992

Performers
Christine Bard (1,3,7) – drums
Anthony Coleman (1,2,3,7,9) – sampler
Mark Degliantoni (1,2,3,9) – sampler
Curtis Fowlkes (1,3) – trombone
Evan Gallagher (1,2,6,8,10) – keyboards, sampler, trombone, cornet
Gisburg (1,4,5,7) – voice (soprano), mouth organ, tin whistle
Roy Nathanson (1,3,7,9) – soprano, alto, tenor
James Pugliese (1,2,7,9) – drums, sampler, percussion
Marcus Rojas (1,13) – tuba
David Shea (1,2,9) – sampler
Doug Wieselman (1) – clarinet
Michelle Kinney (2,13) – cello, electronics
Tim Spelios (2) – CD players
David Weinstein (2) – sampler
Brad Jones (3) – string bass
Myra Melford (3) – synthesizer
Zeena Parkins (3,7) – electric harp
Marc Ribot (3,7) – electric guitar
Jay Rodrigues (3) – alto
E.J. Rodriguez (3,14) – drums, percussion
Bill Ware (3) – vibraphone
Jeff Buckley (4,5) – voice (tenor)
M. Doughty (4,5) – voice (tenor)
Judy Dunaway (4,5,8) – voice (mezzo-soprano), electric guitar, balloons
Mark Ettinger (4,5) – voice (tenor)
Cassie Hoffman (4,5) – voice (soprano)
Nina Mankin (4,5) – voice (mezzo-soprano)
Chris Nelson (4,5) – voice (baritone)
Juliet Palmer (4,5) – voice (alto)
Wilbur Pauley (4,5) – voice (bass)
Rick Porterfield (4,5) – voice (baritone)
Eric Qin (4,5) – voice (baritone)
Kevin Sharp (4,5) – voice (throat)
Louie Belogenis (6) – drums
Steven Bernstein (6,10,13,14) – sampler, trumpet, slide trumpet
Dawn Buckholz (6) – sampler
Joe Gallant (6,10) – string bass, 6-string contrabass guitar
Randy Hutton (6) – synthesizer
Margaret Lancaster (6) – soprano, alto
Fred Lonberg-Holm (6,8,11,12) – electric harp, tape recorder, CD players, noisemakers, cornet
Vito Ricci (6) – electric guitar
Walter Thompson (6,10) – alto, baritone, flute
Ed Broms (7) – string bass
Tamela Glenn (7) – voice (soprano)
Lee Hyla (7) – sampler
Tim Smith (7) – bass clarinet
Chris Wood (7,9) – string bass
Bob Lipman (8) – electric guitar, bongos, percussion
Leslie Ross (8,11,12) – bassoon, electric bassoon, shawm, various reeds
Blaise Siwula (8) – alto, trumpet
Kiku Wada (8) – electric guitar
David Watson (8,11,12) – electric guitar, trumpet
Steve Waxman (8) – electric bass, pocket trumpet, percussion
Michael Evans (9,10) – drums, percussion
Craig Flanagin (9) – electric guitar
K.J. Grant (9,11,12) – electric bass, voice (alto)
John King (9) – dobro
Sharon Topper (9) – voice (soprano), noisemakers
John Zorn (9) – alto
David Cast Castigilione (10,14) – tenor, bass clarinet, baritone saxophone
Allan Chase (10) – soprano, alto
Hollis Headrick (10) – drums
Rolf Sturm (10) – electric guitar
Steve Swell (10) – trombone
Thomas Ulrich (10) – cello
Nick Balaban (11,12) – synthesizers
April Chung (11,12) – violin
Paul Hoskin (11,12) – baritone
Donna Jewell (11,12) – voice (soprano)
James Lo (11,12) – drums
Makigami Koichi (11,12) – voice (tenor)
Matthew Ostrowski (11,12) – analog synthesizer
Greg Anderson (13) – acoustic, string instruments
David Krakauer (13) – clarinet, bass clarinet
Frank London (13) – trumpet, percussion
Paul Morrissett (13) – kaval, gaida, violin
Andrea Parkins (13) – accordion
Sebastian Steinberg (13) – electric bass
Alicia Svigals (13) – violin
Jane Tomkiewicz (13) – percussion
Billy Martin (14) – percussion, talking drum
Ben Perowsky (14) – drums
Adam Rogers (14) – electric guitar
Dan Rosengard (14) – synthesizers
Danny Sedownik (14) – percussion
Paul Shapiro (14) – soprano, tenor, flute
David Tronzo (14) – slide guitar

References

Cobra (Zorn) albums
John Zorn live albums
1995 live albums
Albums recorded at the Knitting Factory